Eze Nri Anyamata was the seventh king of Nri Kingdom after succeeding Eze Nri Ọmalonyeso. He was succeeded by Eze Nri Fenenu after he reigned from 1465 to 1511 CE.

References

Nri-Igbo
Nri monarchs
Kingdom of Nri
15th-century monarchs in Africa
16th-century monarchs in Africa